The 2013 Japanese Formula 3 Championship was the 35th edition of the Japanese Formula 3 Championship. It was the first Formula Three championship that accepted new FIA Formula 3 engine rules.

Teams and drivers
All teams were Japanese-registered.

Race calendar and results
All rounds were held in Japan.

Championship standings

Drivers' Championships
Points are awarded as follows:

Overall

National Class

Teams' Championship
Points are awarded as follows:

Engine Tuners' Championship

References

External links
 Official Site 

Formula Three
Japanese Formula 3 Championship seasons
Japan Formula Three
Japanese Formula 3